The governor of New South Wales is the viceregal representative of the Australian monarch, King Charles III, in the state of New South Wales. In an analogous way to the governor-general of Australia at the national level, the governors of the Australian states perform constitutional and ceremonial functions at the state level. The governor is appointed by the king on the advice of the premier of New South Wales, and serves in office for an unfixed period of time—known as serving At His Majesty's pleasure—though five years is the general standard of office term. The current governor is retired jurist Margaret Beazley, who succeeded David Hurley on 2 May 2019.

The office has its origin in the 18th-century colonial governors of New South Wales upon its settlement in 1788, and is the oldest continuous institution in Australia. The present incarnation of the position emerged with the Federation of Australia and the New South Wales Constitution Act 1902, which defined the viceregal office as the governor acting by and with the advice of the Executive Council of New South Wales. However, the post still ultimately represented the government of the United Kingdom until, after continually decreasing involvement by the British government, the passage in 1942 of the Statute of Westminster Adoption Act 1942 (see Statute of Westminster) and the Australia Act 1986, after which the governor became the direct, personal representative of the Australian sovereign.

Appointment 

The Office of Governor is required by the New South Wales Constitution Act, 1902. The Australian monarch, on the advice and recommendation of the premier of New South Wales, approves the appointment of governor with a commission issued under the royal sign-manual and Public Seal of the State, who is from then until being sworn in by the premier and chief justice referred to as the governor-designate.

Besides the administration of the oaths of office, there is no set formula for the swearing-in of a governor-designate. The constitution act stipulates that: "Before assuming office, a person appointed to be Governor shall take the Oath or Affirmation of Allegiance and the Oath or Affirmation of Office in the presence of the Chief Justice or another Judge of the Supreme Court." The sovereign will also hold an audience with the appointee and will at that time induct the governor-designate as a Companion of the Order of Australia (AC).

The incumbent will generally serve for at least five years, though this is only a developed convention, and the governor still technically acts at His Majesty's pleasure (or the Royal Pleasure). The premier may therefore recommend to the King that the viceroy remain in his service for a longer period of time, sometimes upwards of more than seven years. A governor may also resign and three have died in office. In such a circumstance, or if the governor leaves the country for longer than one month, the lieutenant governor of New South Wales, concurrently held by the chief justice of New South Wales since 1872, serves as Administrator of the Government and exercises all powers of the governor. Furthermore, if the lieutenant governor becomes incapacitated while serving in the office of governor or is also absent from the state, the next most senior judge of the Supreme Court is sworn in as the administrator.

Selection 
Between 1788 and 1957, all governors were born outside New South Wales and were often members of the peerage. Historian A. J. P. Taylor once noted that "going out and governing New South Wales became the British aristocracy's 'abiding consolation'". However, even though the implementation of the Australian Citizenship Act in 1948 established the concept of an independent Australian citizenship, the idea of Australian-born persons being appointed governor of New South Wales was much earlier. Coincidentally the first Australian-born governor, Sir John Northcott on 1 August 1946, was also the first Australian-born governor of any state. However, as Northcott was born in Victoria, it was not until Sir Eric Woodward's appointment by Queen Elizabeth II in 1957 that the position was filled by a New South Welshman; this practice continued until 1996, when Queen Elizabeth II commissioned as her representative Gordon Samuels, a London-born immigrant to Australia.

Although required by the tenets of constitutional monarchy to be non-partisan while in office, governors were frequently former politicians, many being members of the House of Lords by virtue of their peerage. The first governors were all military officers and the majority of governors since have come from a military background, numbering 19. Samuels was the first governor in New South Wales history without a political or common public service background – a former justice of the Supreme Court of New South Wales. The first woman to hold this position is also the first Lebanese-Australian governor, Dame Marie Bashir.

Role
As the sovereign predominantly lives outside New South Wales, the governor's primary task is to perform the sovereign's constitutional duties on their behalf.

It is the governor who is required, by the Constitution Act 1902, to appoint persons to the Government of New South Wales, who are all theoretically tasked with tendering to the monarch and viceroy guidance on the exercise of the Royal Prerogative. Convention dictates that the governor must draw from the Parliament an individual to act as premier, who is also capable of forming governmentin almost all cases the Member of Parliament who commands the confidence of the Legislative Assembly. The premier then directs the governor to appoint other members of parliament to the Executive Council of New South Wales known as the Cabinet, and it is in practice only from this group of ministers of the Crown that the King and governor will take direction on the use of executive power, an arrangement called the King-in-Council or, more specifically, the Governor-in-Council. In this capacity, the governor will issue royal proclamations and sign orders in council. The governor-in-council is also required to appoint in the King's name the president of the Legislative Council, the speaker of the Legislative Assembly, Supreme Court and District Court justices, and local court magistrates in the state, though all of these are made on the advice of either the premier and cabinet or the majority of elected members of each house in the case of the speaker or president. The advice given by the Cabinet is, in order to ensure the stability of government, typically binding; both the King and his viceroy, however, may in exceptional circumstances invoke the reserve powers, which remain the Crown's final check against a ministry's abuse of power, this was last fully exercised in 1932, when Sir Philip Game revoked the commission of Premier Jack Lang.

The governor alone is constitutionally mandated to summon parliament. Beyond that, the viceroy carries out the other conventional parliamentary duties in the sovereign's absence, including reading the Speech from the throne and the proroguing and dissolving of parliament. The governor grants royal assent in the King's name; legally, by granting royal assent (making the bill law), withholding royal assent (vetoing the bill), or reserving the bill for the King's pleasure (allowing the sovereign to personally grant or withhold assent). If the governor withholds the King's assent, the sovereign may, within two years, disallow the bill, thereby annulling the law in question. No modern viceroy has denied royal assent to a bill. With most constitutional functions delegated to Cabinet, the governor acts in a primarily ceremonial fashion. The governor hosts members of Australia's royal family, as well as foreign royalty and heads of state. Also as part of international relations, the governor receives letters of credence and of recall from foreign consuls-general appointed to Sydney. When they are the longest-serving state governor, the governor of New South Wales holds a dormant commission to act as the administrator of the Commonwealth when the governor-general of Australia is absent from Australia, a role most recently held by Governor Bashir.

The governor is also tasked with fostering unity and pride. The governor inducts individuals into the various national orders and present national medals and decorations, however the most senior awards such as ACs or the Victoria Cross are the sole prerogative of the governor general. The governor also ex-officio serves as Honorary Colonel of the Royal New South Wales Regiment (since 1960), Honorary Air Commodore of No. 22 (City of Sydney) Squadron, Royal Australian Air Force (since 1937) and Honorary Commodore of the Royal Australian Navy , as well as the Chief Scout for New South Wales.

Symbols and protocol
As the personal representative of the monarch, the governor follows only the sovereign in the NSW order of precedence. The incumbent governor is entitled to use the style of His or Her Excellency, while in office. On 28 November 2013 the premier of NSW announced that the Queen had given approval for the title of "The Honourable" to be accorded to the governors and former governors of New South Wales. Upon installation, the governor serves as a Deputy Prior of the Most Venerable Order of the Hospital of Saint John of Jerusalem in Australia and is also traditionally invested as either a Knight or Dame of Justice or Grace of the Order. It is also customary that the governor is made a Companion of the Order of Australia, though this is not necessarily automatic.

The Viceregal Salute—composed of the first and last four bars of the national anthem ("Advance Australia Fair")—is the salute used to greet the governor upon arrival at, and mark his or her departure from most official events, although "God Save The King", as the royal anthem, is also used. To mark the viceroy's presence at any building, ship, aeroplane, or car in Australia, the governor's flag is employed. The present form was adopted on 15 January 1981. The state badge of the New South Wales crowned with the St Edward's Crown is employed as the badge of the governor, appearing on the viceroy's flag and on other objects associated with the person or the office.

Past and present standards of the governor

History

Aside from the Crown itself, the office of Governor of New South Wales is the oldest constitutional office in Australia. Captain Arthur Phillip assumed office as Governor of New South Wales on 7 February 1788, when the Colony of New South Wales, the first British settlement in Australia, was formally proclaimed. The early colonial governors held an almost autocratic power due to the distance from and poor communications with Great Britain, until 1824 when the New South Wales Legislative Council, Australia's first legislative body, was appointed to advise the governor.

Between 1850 and 1861, the Governor of New South Wales was titled Governor-General, in an early attempt at federalism imposed by Earl Grey. All communication between the Australian colonies and the British Government was meant to go through the Governor-General, and the other colonies had lieutenant-Governors. As South Australia (1836), Tasmania (January 1855) and Victoria (May 1855) obtained responsible government, their lieutenant-Governors were replaced by Governors. Although he had ceased acting as a Governor-General, Sir William Denison retained the title until his retirement in 1861.

The six British colonies in Australia joined to form the Commonwealth of Australia in 1901. New South Wales and the other colonies became states in the federal system under the Constitution of Australia. In 1902, the New South Wales Constitution Act 1902 confirmed the modern system of government of New South Wales as a state, including defining the role of the governor as the monarch's representative, who acts by and with the advice of the Executive Council. Like the new federal Governor-General and the other state governors, in the first years after federation, the governor of New South Wales continued to act both as a constitutional head of the state, and as a liaison between the government and the imperial government in London. However, the British government's involvement in Australian affairs gradually reduced in the next few years.

In 1942, the Commonwealth of Australia passed the Statute of Westminster Adoption Act 1942, which rendered Australia dominion status under the Statute of Westminster, and while Australia and Britain share the same person as monarch, that person acts in a distinct capacity when acting as the monarch of each dominion. The convention that the monarch acts in respect of Australian affairs on the advice of his or her Australian ministers, rather than his or her British ministers, became enshrined in law. For New South Wales however, because the Statute of Westminster did not disturb the constitutional arrangements of the Australian states, the governor remains (at least formally) in New South Wales the representative of the British monarch. This arrangement seemed incongruous with the Commonwealth of Australia's independent dominion status conferred by the Statute of Westminster, and with the federal structure.

After much negotiation between the federal and state governments of Australia, the British government and Buckingham Palace, the Australia Act 1986 removed any remaining constitutional roles of the British monarch and British government in the Australian states, and established that the governor of New South Wales (along with the other state governors) was the direct, personal representative of the Australian monarch, and not the British monarch or the British government, nor the governor-general of Australia or the Australian federal government.

Residences and household

Government House

On his arrival in Sydney in 1788, Governor Phillip resided in a temporary wood and canvas house before the construction of a more substantial house on a site now bounded by Bridge Street and Phillip Street, Sydney. This first Government House was extended and repaired by the following eight governors, but was generally in poor condition and was vacated when the governor relocated to the new building in 1845, designed by Edward Blore and Mortimer Lewis.

With the federation of the Australian colonies in 1901, it was announced that Government House was to serve as the secondary residence of the new governor-general of Australia. As a consequence the NSW Government leased the residence of Cranbrook, Bellevue Hill as the residence of the governor. This arrangement lasted until 1913 when the NSW Government terminated the Commonwealth lease of Government House (the governor-general moved to the new Sydney residence of Admiralty House), the governor from 1913 to 1917, Sir Gerald Strickland, continued to live in Cranbrook and on his departure his successor returned to Government House.

On 16 January 1996, Premier Bob Carr announced that the next governor would be Gordon Samuels, that he would not live or work at Government House and that he would retain his appointment as chairman of the New South Wales Law Reform Commission. On these changes, Carr said: "The Office of the Governor should be less associated with pomp and ceremony, less encumbered by anachronistic protocol, more in tune with the character of the people." The state's longest-serving governor, Sir Roden Cutler, was also reported as saying: "It's a political push to make way in New South Wales to lead the push for a republic. If they decide not to have a Governor and the public agrees with that, and Parliament agrees, and the queen agrees to it, that is a different matter, but while there is a Governor you have got to give him some respectability and credibility, because he is the host for the whole of New South Wales. For the life of me I cannot understand the logic of having a Governor who is part-time and doesn’t live at Government House. It is such a degrading of the office and of the Governor."

In October 2011, the new premier, Barry O'Farrell, announced that the governor, now Dame Marie Bashir, had agreed with O'Farrell's offer to move back into Government House: "A lot of people believe the Governor should live at Government House. That's what it was built for ... [A]t some stage a rural or regional governor will be appointed and we will need to provide accommodation at Government House so it makes sense to provide appropriate living areas". With the Governor's return, management of the residence reverted to the Office of the Governor in December 2013.

Summer residence

In addition to the primary Sydney vice-regal residence, many governors had also felt the need for a 'summer retreat' to escape the hard temperatures of the Sydney summers. In 1790, Governor Phillip had a secondary residence built in the township of Parramatta. In 1799 the second governor, John Hunter, had the remains of Arthur Phillip's cottage cleared away, and a more permanent building erected on the same site. This residence remained occupied until the completion of the primary Government House in 1845, however the hard summers and growing size of Sydney convinced successive governors of the need for a rural residence.

The governor from 1868 to 1872, the Earl Belmore, used Throsby Park in Moss Vale as his summer residence. His successor, Sir Hercules Robinson, often retired privately to the same area, in the Southern Highlands, for the same reason. In 1879 it was then decided that the colony should purchase a house at Sutton Forest for use as a permanent summer residence, and in 1881 the NSW Government purchased for £6000 a property known as "Prospect" that had been built by Robert Pemberton Richardson (of the firm Richardson & Wrench). This was renamed "Hillview", and became the primary summer governor's residence from 1885 to 1957. In 1957, seen as unnecessary and expensive, Hillview was put up for sale and purchased from the state government by Edwin Klein. Hillview was returned to the people of NSW in 1985 and is currently leased under the ownership of the Office of Environment and Heritage.

Household
The viceregal household aids the governor in the execution of the royal constitutional and ceremonial duties and is managed by the Office of the Governor, whose current official secretary and chief of staff is Michael Miller RFD. These organised offices and support systems include aides-de-camp, press officers, financial managers, speech writers, trip organisers, event planners and protocol officers, chefs and other kitchen employees, waiters, and various cleaning staff, as well as tour guides. In this official and bureaucratic capacity, the entire household is often referred to as Government House. These departments are funded through the annual budget, as is the governor's salary of A$529,000.

List of governors of New South Wales 
The following individuals have served as a governor of New South Wales:

See also 

 Spouse of the governor of New South Wales
 Governor-General of Australia
 Governors of the Australian states
 Governor's Body Guard of Light Horse

Notes

References

External links 

 Governor of New South Wales official website

 
New South Wales
Parliament of New South Wales
New South Wales-related lists
1788 establishments in Australia